The Calcare di Cellina (Italian for Cellina Limestone, is a Hauterivian to Aptian geologic formation in Friulia-Venezia Giulia, Italy. Fossil sauropod tracks have been reported from the formation.

Description 
The Calcare di Cellina comprises a limestone facies corresponding to the peritidal successions of the inner part of the Periadriatic carbonate platforms. The layer in which the tracks were found is characterized by intertidal muds which were later covered and sealed by a transgressive subtidal layer, representing a moderately more open but low energy environment. Most of the limestone blocks show similar lithofacies, with bed thickness exceeding a metre, the presence of occasional stylolites and rare requienids; the bed surfaces present mud cracks, bioturbation due to burrowing organisms and pedogenetic breccias (sometimes with black pebbles). The color ranges from whitish through light brown to pale pink. The blocks sometimes present desiccation structures (mud cracks, birdseyes) and mostly comprise muddy facies, often with ostracods. In contrast, the level with the footprint is a fossiliferous wackestone (with foraminifers and ostracods), with no traces of subaerial exposure.

Fossil content 
The following fossils were reported from the formation:
Ichnofossils
 Carnosauria indet.
 Sauropoda indet.
 ?Dinosauria indet.
Foraminifera
 Campanellula capuensis
Flora
 Salpingoporella dinarica

See also 
 List of dinosaur-bearing rock formations
 List of stratigraphic units with sauropodomorph tracks
 Sauropod tracks

References

Bibliography 
  
 
 

Geologic formations of Italy
Lower Cretaceous Series of Europe
Cretaceous Italy
Aptian Stage
Barremian Stage
Hauterivian Stage
Limestone formations
Paludal deposits
Ichnofossiliferous formations
Paleontology in Italy